WREV (1220 AM), the format of which is known as La Grande, is a radio station in Reidsville, North Carolina broadcasting music and news in Spanish. It is part of a five-station network.

Station history
Prior to purchase by Que Pasa Media, WREV broadcast a country music format and aired several community-oriented talk shows. The call letters refer to the local newspaper, The Reidsville Review. WWMO, now WJMH, was co-owned with the station.

References

External links

REV
REV
Radio stations established in 1948
1948 establishments in North Carolina